Hasek may refer to:
 Hašek, a Czech surname
 Hasek, Iran
 Hasek Coolidge, Eliska